Robert Bruce Langdon (November 24, 1826 – July 24, 1895) was an American businessman, contractor, and politician.

Biography
Langdon was born on a farm in New Haven, Vermont and went to the Vermont public schools. Langdon moved to Saint Paul, Minnesota in 1858 and then to Minneapolis, with his wife and family, in 1866. Langdon was a contractor and had built bridges, roads, buildings, and railways. Langdon served in the Minnesota Senate from 1873 to 1878 and from 1881 to 1886 and was a Republican. He was also a member of the Whig Party.

He died in Minneapolis on July 24, 1895, and was buried at Lakewood Cemetery.

Legacy
The communities of Langdon, Minnesota and of Langdon, North Dakota were named after Langdon.

References

1825 births
1895 deaths
People from New Haven, Vermont
Businesspeople from Minneapolis
Politicians from Minneapolis
Minnesota Republicans
Minnesota Whigs
Minnesota state senators
American city founders
Burials at Lakewood Cemetery